Egon Paljar (born 15 April 1974) is a former Croatian national team handball player. He is currently coach of RK Selce.

Paljar played for clubs in Croatia, Germany, Bosnia and Herzegovina, Greece and Switzerland. He last played for RK Crikvenica where he retired and coached the team after retiring from playing.</ref> He is currently coach of RK Selce.

Paljar played 40 international matches for Croatia and represented his country at 1998 European Championship.

Honours

RK Zagreb
Croatian First A League (3): 1997–98, 1998–99, 2003–04
Croatian Cup (3): 1998, 1999, 2004
EHF Champions League Final (1): 1998–99

References

External links
Eurohandball profile
Paljar Switzerland

1974 births
Living people
Croatian male handball players
RK Zagreb players
RK Zamet players
RK Crikvenica coaches
Handball players from Rijeka
Croatian expatriate sportspeople in Greece
Croatian expatriate sportspeople in Switzerland
Croatian expatriate sportspeople in Germany
Expatriate handball players